Saravanan Surya Mani or M. Saravanan, also known as AVM Saravanan or Meiyappa Saravanan, is an Indian producer of Tamil films. His production company is AVM Productions, which was founded in 1945 by his father, the famed director-producer A. V. Meiyappan, who is widely regarded as one of the pioneers of Tamil cinema. He has been involved in hits such as Naanum Oru Penn, Samsaram Adhu Minsaram,Sivaji: The Boss, Vettaikaran, Minsara Kanavu, Leader and Ayan. He is the father of M. S. Guhan, another producer of movies. He owns the AVM Studios in Chennai. As a producer he won two Filmfare Awards South.

Awards
Filmfare Awards South
Best Film - Tamil - Naanum Oru Penn (1963)
Best Film - Tamil - Samsaram Adhu Minsaram (1986)

References

External links

Living people
Film producers from Chennai
Tamil film producers
Year of birth missing (living people)